Søndeled is a village in Risør municipality in Agder county, Norway. The village is located at the western end of the Søndeledfjorden at the mouth of the river Brøbøvann.

Historically, the village was the administrative centre of the old municipality of Søndeled which existed from 1838 until its dissolution in 1964. People from this area are called søndølingar. The Norwegian County Road 418 runs through the village, connecting to the European route E18 highway a short distance to the southwest. The village has a school, shops, and Søndeled Church.

Name
The village (and municipality) is named after the fjord that it sits along (Old Norse: Sundaleiðr, now called the Søndeledfjorden). The first element comes from the word sundene 'straits' and the last element is led (Old Norse: leið) 'path, way'. Hence the name means the 'path between the straits'.

Notable residents
Berge Helle Kringlebotn, a local politician
Sigurd Marcussen, a local politician and trade union leader

References

Villages in Agder
Risør